Demirli is a village in the Derik District of Mardin Province in Turkey. The village is populated by Kurds of the Sefan tribe and had a population of 1,147 in 2021.

References 

Villages in Derik District
Kurdish settlements in Mardin Province